Backcountry is a 2014 Canadian nature–survival horror film, written and directed by Adam MacDonald, marking his feature film directorial debut. It is loosely based on the true story of a hungry man-eating black bear that attacked Mark Jordan and Jacqueline Perry, in the back country of Missinaibi Lake Provincial Park, North of Chapleau, Ontario in 2005, events for which Mark later received the Star of Courage award from Governor General Michaëlle Jean.

The film premiered at the 2014 Toronto International Film Festival, and received generally positive reviews from critics upon release.

Plot
Alex and his girlfriend Jenny arrive at a provincial park to go camping for the weekend. In hopes of exploring a trail he loved when he was younger, Alex refuses a map from the park ranger, confident that he knows the park well. On the first night after they set up camp, they encounter a tour guide named Brad who Jenn invites to have dinner with them. Brad flirts with Jenn, much to Alex's annoyance; the two confront one another and Brad leaves.

The following morning, Alex decides to go off-trail, deeper into the park where he remembers there is a lake with a waterfall. On the way, he sees a bear paw print in the ground but does not alert Jenn. They also discover a half-eaten deer carcass. When they arrive at where Alex believes the lake to be, they discover it is not and he realises they are lost. Panicked, Jenn looks for her cell phone to call for help but Alex reveals he removed it from her backpack and left it in the car, worried that she would be distracted by it all weekend. The pair argue, and Jenn reveals she never wanted to come hiking. Alex tells her he was planning to propose.

They make camp for the night and, as the pair sleep, a huge black bear approaches the tent. In the morning, they find all of their food has been eaten. As they continue hiking, they come across a bear bed and, realising there is a bear near, decide to walk as far as they can while it's light. The following morning, Alex awakes to see the bear a few metres from the tent. It approaches and eventually claws its way through, injuring Jenn's arm. She briefly wards it off with bear spray but it returns, and Jenn watches in horror as Alex is dragged from the tent and brutally mauled to death. Jenn flees without any belongings.

Jenn rests for the night high up in a tree; she awakes to the sound of a helicopter overhead, but fails to get its attention. Stalked again by the bear, she manages to escape by climbing down a waterfall, but slips and breaks her ankle. Using a makeshift splint, she struggles through the park using her flare as a guide. Miraculously, Jenn makes it back to their starting point where they left their canoe. She paddles back to the park entrance and collapses in the parking lot. Brad, who is getting ready to lead a tour, notices her and rushes over to help.

Cast
 Missy Peregrym as Jen
 Jeff Roop as Alex
 Eric Balfour as Brad
 Nicholas Campbell as the Ranger
 Chester and Charlie as the Bear

Production
Production took place from October through November 2013. The film was shot in Powassan, Ontario and Caddy Lake, Manitoba and was funded by Telefilm Canada and Northern Ontario Heritage Fund.

Release
The film premiered at the Toronto International Film Festival on September 8, 2014.

Reception
On review aggregator Rotten Tomatoes, Backcountry holds an approval rating of 92%, based on 50 reviews, and an average rating of 7/10. Its consensus reads, "Tense, well-acted, and at once atmospheric as well as brutally impactful, Backcountry marks a memorably assured debut from writer-director Adam MacDonald." On Metacritic, the film has a weighted average score of 62 out of 100, based on 5 critics, indicating "generally positive reviews".

References

External links
 
 
 

2014 films
2014 horror films
2014 horror thriller films
2010s survival films
English-language Canadian films
Canadian horror thriller films
Canadian natural horror films
Films about bears
Films about couples
Films set in forests
IFC Films films
Films shot in Ontario
Films shot in Manitoba
2010s English-language films
2010s Canadian films